Satakarni II (Brahmi script: 𑀲𑀸𑀢𑀓𑀡𑀺, Sātakaṇi) was the fourth of the Satavahana kings, who ruled the Deccan region of India. His reign is generally dated to 50-25 BCE.

Satakarni II conquered eastern Malwa from the Shungas or the Kanvas, following the conquest of western Malwa by early Satavahana kings. This allowed him access to the Buddhist site of Sanchi, in which he is credited with the building of the decorated gateways around the original Mauryan Empire and Sunga stupas.

According to the Puranic lists of future kings, "137 years after the accession of Chandragupta Maurya, the Sungas will rule for 112 years and then the Kanvayanas for 45 years whose last king Susharman will be killed by the Andhra Simuka". If the accession of Chandragupta Maurya is dated to 324 BCE, then Simuka started to rule 294 years later, in 30 BCE. Simuka is then said to have ruled for 23 years, and his successor Kanha for 18 years, which would give 10 CE for the accession of his successor Satakarni.

A dedicatory inscription under "King Sri Satakarni" at Sanchi is thought to date to the time of Satakarni II. The Siri-Satakani inscription in the Brahmi script records the gift of one of the top architraves of the Southern Gateway by the artisans of the Satavahana king Satakarni II:

The reign of Satakarni II was followed by the collapse of the Satavahana Empire, and the victories of the Western Satraps ruler Nahapana. The Satavahana Empire would later revive under the rule of Gautamiputra Satakarni.

Notes

References
 
 
 

Satavahana dynasty
1st-century BC Indian monarchs
Year of death unknown
Year of birth unknown